Wang Yen railway station is a railway station located in Wang Yen Subdistrict, Mueang Kanchanaburi District, Kanchanaburi Province.

References 

Railway stations in Thailand
Kanchanaburi province